Tiramakhan Traore (variations : Tiramakhan Traoré or Tirimakhan Trawally) was a 13th-century general in the Mali Empire who served under Sundiata Keita. Traore expanded the power of Mali westward and set up the Kabu Empire. In his conquest of the region, he is reported to have defeated the Bainuk king Kikikor and annexed his state.  The Guelowar royal family, including the royal family of Kaabu prior to their defeat at the Battle of Kansala, claimed descent from  Tiramakhan Traore.

Conquest of Senegambia
Oral histories hold that around 1235CE Traore led a group of 75,000 people, including 40,000 free men and woman as well as 35,000 slaves and numerous artisans, west from the traditional Manding lands. Sundiata also sent his son Mansa Wali with Traore to learn from him and as a sign of trust. The column moved slowly, taking a year to reach Wuli in what is now the eastern end of The Gambia, growing crops along the way. They established the village of Kabakama, now a neighborhood of Basse Santa Su. A few years later, Traore marched on Mampating and defeated Kikikor, the king of the Bainuk. He founded many new Mandinka towns, and ultimately died in Mampating and was buried in Basse. A tree survived into the 19th century that supposedly marked Tiramakhan Traore's tomb.

References

Further reading
Ki-Zerbo, Joseph, UNESCO General History of Africa, Vol. IV, Abridged Edition: Africa from the Twelfth to the Sixteenth Century, (editors : Joseph Ki-Zerbo, Djibril Tamsir Niane), University of California Press, 1998, pp 55 – 56, 

Malian military personnel
History of Mali
History of Senegal
Year of death unknown
History of Guinea-Bissau
History of the Gambia
Year of birth unknown